Ole Ivar Løvaas (8 May 1927 – 2 August 2010) was a Norwegian-American clinical psychologist and professor at the University of California, Los Angeles. He is most well known for his research on what is now called applied behavior analysis (ABA) to teach autistic children through prompts, modeling, and positive reinforcement. The therapy is also noted for its former use of aversives (punishment) to reduce undesired behavior.

Lovaas founded the Lovaas Institute and co-founded the Autism Society of America. He is also considered a pioneer of ABA due to his development of discrete trial training and controversial early intensive behavioral intervention for autistic children.

His work influenced how autism is treated, and Lovaas received widespread acclaim and several awards during his lifetime.

Personal life 
Lovaas was born in Lier, Norway on 8 May 1927 to Hildur and Ernst Albert Lovaas. He had 2 siblings: an older sister named Nora and a younger brother named Hans Erik. Lovaas attended Hegg Elementary School in Lier from 1934 to 1941. He attended junior high school at Drammen Realskole until 1944, and then moved on to Drammen Latin School for high school, graduating in 1947.

Following World War II, Lovaas moved to the United States. He married Beryl Scoles in 1955, and together they had four children. Lovaas later divorced his wife and remarried Nina Watthen in 1986.

Career 
After graduating from high school, Lovaas served in the Norwegian Air Force for 18 months. He was a forced farm worker during the 1940s Nazi occupation of Norway, and often said that observing the Nazis had sparked his interest in human behavior.

He attended Luther College in Decorah, Iowa, graduating in 1951 after just one year with his B.A. in sociology. Lovaas received his Masters of Science in clinical psychology from the University of Washington in 1955, and his PhD in learning and clinical psychology from the same school 3 years later.

Early in his career, Lovaas worked at the Pinel foundation, which focused on Freudian psychoanalysis. After earning his PhD, he took a position at the University of Washington's Child Development Institute, where he first learned of behavior analysis. Lovaas began teaching at UCLA in 1961 in the Department of Psychology, where he performed research on children with autism spectrum disorder at the school's Neuropsychiatric Institute. He started an early intervention clinic at UCLA called the UCLA Young Autism Project, which provided intensive intervention inside the children's homes. He was named professor emeritus in 1994. Lovaas also established the Lovaas Institute for Early Intervention (LIFE) that provides interventions based on his research.

Lovaas taught now prominent behaviorists, such as Robert Koegel, Laura Schreibman, Tristram Smith, Doreen Granpeesheh, John McEachin, Ron Leaf, Jacquie Wynn, and thousands of UCLA students who took his "Behavior Modification" course during his 50 years of teaching. He also co-founded what is today the Autism Society of America (ASA), published hundreds of research articles and several books, and received many accolades for his research. Due to this research, a number of school districts have adopted his programs. His work influenced how autism is treated.

Research

Autism intervention

Early research 
Lovaas established the Young Autism Project clinic at UCLA in 1962, where he began his research, authored training manuals, and recorded tapes of him and his graduate students implementing errorless learning—based on operant conditioning and what was then referred to as behavior modification—to instruct autistic children. He later coined the term "discrete trial training" to describe the procedure, which was used to teach listener responding, eye contact, fine and gross motor imitation, receptive and expressive language, academic, and a variety of other skills. In an errorless discrete trial, the child sits at a table across from the therapist who provides an instruction (i.e., "do this", "look at me", "point to", etc.), followed by a prompt, then the child's response, and a stimulus reinforcer. The prompts are later discontinued once the child demonstrates proficiency. During this time, Lovaas and colleagues also employed physical aversives (punishment), such as electric shocks and slaps, to decrease aggressive and self-injurious behavior, as well as verbal reprimands if the child answered incorrectly or engaged in self-stimulatory behavior.

1987 study 
In 1987, Lovaas published a study which demonstrated that, following forty hours a week of treatment, 9 of the 19 autistic children developed typical spoken language, increased IQs by 30 points on average, and were placed in regular classrooms. A 1993 follow-up study found that 8 maintained their gains and were "indistinguishable from their typically developing peers", scoring in the normal range of social and emotional functioning. His studies were limited because Lovaas did not randomize the participants or treatment groups. This produced a quasi-experiment in which he was able to control the assignment of children to treatment groups. His manipulation of the study in this way may have been responsible for the observed effects. The true efficacy of his method cannot be determined since his studies cannot be repeated for ethical reasons. A 1998 study subsequently recommended that EIBI programs be regarded with skepticism. In 1999, the United States Surgeon General said, "Thirty years of research has demonstrated the efficacy of applied behavioral methods in reducing inappropriate behavior and in increasing communication, learning, and appropriate social behavior", and he also endorsed the 1987 study.

Literature reviews 
According to a 2007 review study in Pediatrics, "The effectiveness of [EIBI] in [autism spectrum disorder] has been well-documented through 5 decades of research by using single-subject methodology and in controlled studies... in university and community settings." It further stated, "Children who receive early intensive behavioral treatment have been shown to make substantial, sustained gains in IQ, language, academic performance, and adaptive behavior as well as some measures of social behavior, and their outcomes have been significantly better than those of children in control groups." However, the study also recommended to later generalize the child's skills with more naturalistic ABA-based procedures, such as incidental teaching and pivotal response treatment, so their progress is maintained.

Another review in 2008 described DTT as a "'well-established' psychosocial intervention for improving the intellectual performance of young children with autism spectrum disorders..." In 2011, it was found that the intervention is effective for some, but "the literature is limited by methodological concerns" due to there being small sample sizes and very few studies that used random assignment, and a 2018 Cochrane review subsequently indicated low-quality evidence to support this method. Nonetheless, a meta-analysis in the same journal database concludes how some recent research is beginning to suggest that because of the heterology of ASD, there is a wide range of different learning styles and that it is the children with receptive language delays who acquire spoken language from Lovaas' treatment.

Experiments on gender-variant children (conversion therapy)
Lovaas co-authored a study with George Rekers in 1974 where they attempted to modify the behavior of feminine male children through the use of rewards and punishment with the goal of preventing them from becoming homosexuals. The subject of the first of these studies, a young boy at the age of 4 at the inception of the experiment, died by suicide as an adult in 2003; his family attribute the suicide to this treatment. Despite the follow-up study (which Lovaas was not involved in) writing that the therapy successfully converted his sexual orientation, his sister expressed concerns that it was overly biased as "he was conditioned to say that", and she read his journal, which described how he feared disclosing his sexual orientation due to his father spanking him as a child as punishment for engaging in feminine-like behavior, such as playing with dolls.

In October 2020, the Journal of Applied Behavior Analysis officially issued an Expression of Concern about the Rekers and Lovaas study. In the editorial accompanying the Expression of Concern, the journal discusses the damage done by the study. It emphasizes that the study inflicted personal harm upon the study's subject and his family, as well as to the gay community, for inappropriately promoting the study as evidence that conversion therapy is effective. It also argues that the field of behavior analysis was harmed by the false portrayal that the study and the use of conversion therapy are currently representative of the field.

Awards and accolades 
Lovaas received praise from several organizations during his lifetime. In 2001, he was given the Society of Clinical Child and Adolescent Psychology Distinguished Career Award. He received the Edgar Doll Award from the 33rd Division of the American Psychological Association, the Lifetime Research Achievement Award from the 55th Division of the American Psychological Association, and the Award for Effective Presentation of Behavior Analysis in the Mass Media by the Association for Behavior Analysis International. Lovaas also earned a Guggenheim fellowship and the California Senate Award, which is an honorary doctorate. He was named a Fellow by Division 7 of the American Psychological Association and was given the Champion of Mental Health Award by Psychology Today.

Criticism 
The goal of making autistic people indistinguishable from their peers has attracted significant backlash from autistic advocates. Julia Bascom of the Autistic Self Advocacy Network (ASAN) has said "ASAN's objection is fundamentally an ethical one. The stated end goal of ABA is an autistic child who is 'indistinguishable from their peers'—an autistic child who can pass as neurotypical. We don’t think that’s an acceptable goal. The end goal of all services, supports, interventions, and therapies an autistic child receives should be to support them in growing up into an autistic adult who is happy, healthy, and living a self-determined life."

Aversives 
Lovaas is credited with popularizing the use of aversives in behavior modification, as shown in a Life magazine photo spread in 1965.

He later admitted that they were only temporarily effective and punishments became less effective over time. Eventually, Lovaas abandoned these tactics, telling CBS in a 1994 interview, "These people are so used to pain that they can adapt to almost any kind of aversive you give them."

See also
Human rights
 Antipsychiatry
 Autism rights movement
 Neurotribes
Behaviorism
 George Rekers
 Conversion therapy
 Behaviorism
 B.F. Skinner

Bibliography
The Autistic Child: Language Development Through Behavior Modification, 1977
Teaching Developmentally Disabled Children: The Me Book, 1981
Teaching Individuals With Developmental Delays: Basic Intervention Techniques, 2003

References

Further reading
"Screams, Slaps & Love: A surprising, shocking treatment helps far-gone mental cripples". Life magazine, 1965. -- An editorial that promotes Lovaas' physical abuse of autistic children as ground-breaking and highly effective therapy.
—A book that discusses Lovaas' work at the UCLA Gender Identity Clinic.
—A book about the history of research on autism, including the work of Lovaas.

External links
Lovaas Institute for Early Intervention

1927 births
2010 deaths
People from Lier, Norway
Norwegian emigrants to the United States
Luther College (Iowa) alumni
University of Washington alumni
20th-century American psychologists
Autism researchers
Conversion therapy
Sexual orientation change efforts
Norwegian psychologists
University of California, Los Angeles faculty